This article contains information about Illyrian vocabulary. No Illyrian texts survive, so sources for identifying Illyrian words have been identified by Hans Krahe as being of four kinds: inscriptions, glosses of Illyrian words in classical texts, names—including proper names (mostly inscribed on tombstones), toponyms and river names—and Illyrian loanwords in other languages. The last category has proven particularly contentious. The names occur in sources that range over more than a millennium, including numismatic evidence, as well as posited original forms of placenames. The Messapian language, which may be related, does have a small attested corpus, but it is not in this page's scope due to the uncertainty about its relationship to Illyrian.

Proposed etymologies

Illyrian lemmas 
This is a list of lemmas explicitly mentioned as Illyrian by classical authors.

Messapic lemmas 
Messapic language is oftentimes regarded as close to Illyrian even though there is still no consensus among scholars regarding their proximity. See Messapic lemmas for a list of Messapic words.

Non Illyrian words of possible Illyrian origin 
Additionally to the words explicitly mentioned as Illyrian, scholars have extracted a list of non-Illyrian words that may have derived from Illyrian language.

Toponyms, hydronyms, anthroponyms 
Some words have been extracted from toponyms and anthroponyms.

Other lemmas are:

 Agruvium "along the coast between Risinum and Butua": IE *aĝr-; cf. Skt. ájraḥ "pasture, field", Lat. ager, Gk. agrós, Goth. akrs
 Bindus "river god"; cf. Alb. bind  "to convince, to make believe", përbindësh "monster", Old Ir. banne "drop", Skt. bindú, vindú "drops, gob, spot", possibly Lat. fōns Bandusiae and Lusit. Bandua.
 Bosona "Bosna river", literally "running water":  IE *bheg-, bhog- "to run"; Alb. dë-boj "to chase, to drive away", Rus. bĕg "running; (work)flow", Old Ch. Slav. bĕžati and Rus. bĕžatj "to flee, run; to work, to flow", Lith. bėgti "to flee, to run", Gk. phébesthai "to flee", phóbos "fear", Eng. beck "brook, stream", Middle Ir. búal "flowing water", Hindi bhāg "to flee"
 mons Bulsinus "Büžanim hill": IE *bʰl̥kos; cf. Eng. balk, Alb. bligë "forked piece of wood", Middle Ir. blog "piece, fragment", Lat. fulcrum "bedpost", Gk. phálanx "trunk, log", Lith. balžiena "crossbar", Serb. blazína "roof beam", Skt. bhuríjāu "cart arms"
 Derbanoí, Anderva: IE *derw; cf. Eng. tree, Alb. dru "wood", Old Ch. Slav. drĕvo "tree", Rus. dérevo "tree, wood", Welsh derw "oak", Gk. dóry "wood, spear", drýs "oak, tree", Lith. derva "pine wood", Hitt. taru "tree, wood', Thrac. taru "spear", Skt. dru "tree, wood", daru "wood, log"
 Dizēros, Andízētes: IE *digh; cf. Eng. dough, Gk. teîkhos "wall", Lat. fingere "to shape, mold", Old Ir. com-od-ding "he builds, erects", Old Rus. dĕža "kneading trough", Arm. dez "heap", Skt. dehah "body, form"
 Domator, personal name; cf. Old Ir. damnaid "he binds, breaks a horse", dam "ox", Eng. tame, dialectal Germ. zamer "ox not under the yoke", Alb. dem "young bull", Lat. domāre "to tame", domitor "tamer", Gk. dámnēmi "to break in", dámalos "calf", Skt. dāmyáti "he is tame; he tames", Rus. odomashnivat'  "to tame"
 Loúgeon: Strabo in his Geography mentions "a marsh called Lougeon" (which has been identified as Lake Cerknica in Slovenia) by the locals (Illyrian and Celtic tribes), Lougeon being Strabo's rendition of the local toponym into Greek. cf. Alb. lag "to wet, soak, bathe, wash", lëgatë "pool", lug "trough, water-channel, spillway", Lith. liűgas "pool", Old Ch. Slav. & Rus. luža "pool", Rus. loža, lože, lógovo "rest place, lounge place, bed, den", Rus. ležátj "to lie, rest, lounge" and ložitj "to lay, put", Thrac. Lýginos, river name
 stagnus Morsianus "marshlands in Pannonia": IE *merĝ; cf. Middle High Germ. murc "rotten, withered, boggy", Old Ir. meirc "rust", Alb. marth "to shiver, shudder", Lith. markýti "to rust"
 Naro: IE *nor; cf. Alb. "hum-nerë" "abyss, chasm", Lith. nãras "diving duck; diver", Russ. norá "hole, burrow", Serbo-Croat. po-nor "abyss"
 Nedinum: IE *ned; cf. Skt. nadas "roarer"
 Oseriates "lakes": IE *h1eĝʰero; cf. Serb-Croat. jȅzero, Rus. ózero, Lith. éžeras, Latvian ȩzȩrs, Gk. Achérōn "river in the underworld"
 Pelso (Latin authors referred to modern Lake Balaton as "lacus Pelso", Pelso being a hydronym from the local inhabitants), Pelso apparently meant "deep" or "shallow": IE *pels-; cf. Rus. ples (deep place in lake or river), North Alb. fellë (from fell "deep"), Czech pleso "deep place in a river, lake", Welsh bwlch "crack", Arm. pelem "to dig"
 Volcos, river name in Pannonia; cf. Old Ir. folc "heavy rain, wet weather", Welsh golchi "to wash", obsolete Eng. welkin "cloud", Old High Germ. welk "moist", German Wolke "cloud", Old Ch. Slav. and Rus. vlaga "moisture, plant juice", Volga, river name in Russia, ? vŭlgŭkŭ "wet", Latv. val̃gums "wetness", Alb. ulmej "to dampen, wet"

Proposed Illyrian anthroponyms

The following anthroponyms derive from Illyrian or are not yet connected with another language unless noted, such as the Delmatae names of Liburnian origin. Alföldy identified five principal onomastic provinces within the Illyrian area: 1) the "real" Illyrians south of the river Neretva in Dalmatia and extending south to Epirus; 2) the Delmatae, who occupied the middle Adriatic coast between the "real Illyrians" to the south and the Liburni to the north; 3) the Liburni, a branch of Venetic in the northeast Adriatic; 4) the Iapodes, who dwelt north of the Delmatae and behind (inland from) the coastal Liburnians; 5) the Pannonians in the northern lands, and in Bosnia, northern Montenegro and Western Serbia. Katičić does not recognize a separate Pannonian onomastic area, and includes the Pannoni with the Delmatae. Below, names from four of Alföldy's five onomastic areas are listed, Liburnian excluded, having been identified as being akin to Venetic. A Dardanian area is also detailed.

South Illyrian

Agirrus
Agron
Andena (f., attested at Dyrrhachium), Andes, Andis, Andio, Andia
Annaeus/Annaius
Antis (f.)
Ballaios
Bardyllis
Bato, may derive from same root as Latin battuere, "to strike", or the root *bha, "say, tell".
Birkenna
Blodus, Bledis
Boiken
Boria, Bora
Breigos
Brykos
Cleitus/Kleitos (from Greek)
Daors
Dasius
Dazaios, Dazas, Dazos
Ditus
Epe(n)tinus (attested at Dyrrhachium; the name is adjectival, meaning "from Epetium", a town now known as Strobeč)
Epicadus
Epidius
Genthena, Genthios, Gentius
Glaukias (from Greek)
Glavus
Grabos
Laiscus
Madena
Messor
Monunius
Mytilus
Pinnes
Pleuratus
Pladomenus
Plare(n)s
Plator (in Liburnian as Plaetor; Venetic  Plaetorius, cp. Latin Plaetorius)
Posantio
Pravaius
Scerdis
Skerdilaidas
Tatta
Temus, Temeia
Teuda
Teuta, Teutana means Queen in Illyrian.
Tito, Titus (also the Illyrian name of the river Krka)
Vendes
Verzo
Zanatis
Ziraeus

Delmatae
Hundreds of Delmatae names have been recorded. Characteristic names include:

Andena, Andes, Andis, Andio, Andia
Aplis, Apludus, Aplus, Aplius
Apurus
Baezo
Beusas, Beuzas
Curbania
Cursulavia
Iato
Lavincia
Ledrus
Messor
Paio, Paiio
Panes, Panias, Panius (or Pantus, inscription unclear), Panentius
Pant(h)ia/Panto (f.)
Pinsus
Pladomenus
Platino
Samuntio
Seio, Seiio
Statanius, Staticus, Stato, Status
Sestus, Sextus, Sexto
Tito
Tizius
Tritus
Var(r)o

Delmatae names in common with the Pannoni (some also occur among the south Illyrians):

Bardurius.
Bato
Carius
Dasantilla
Dasas, Dazas
Dasto
Plator, Platino
Scenobarbus, Scenobardos (?)
Verzo
Verzulus

Some Delmatae names probably originate from the Liburnians. This conclusion is based on the Liburnian suffixes: -icus, -ica, -ocus, -ico; and from the distribution of the names among the Liburni/Veneti, and from their absence or scarcity in other onomastic areas:

Acenica
Clevata
Darmocus
Germanicus (the native Delmatae stem Germanus, Germus, with the Venetic/Liburnian -icus suffix)
Labrico
Lunnicus
Melandrica
Turus

From the southern Illyrians, the names Boria, Epicadus, Laedicalius, Loiscus, Pinnes and Tato and some others are present. From the Iapodes, Diteio and Ve(n)do, and a few names of Celtic origin (not shown here).

Pannoni
Some names attested among the Pannoni:

Bato (also common among the Delmatae)
Dasas, Dasius (also common among the Delmatae)
Scenobarbus (also common among the Delmatae)
Carvus
Laidus
Liccaius
Plator
Temans
Tueta
Varro
Verzo

The following names are confined to the Pannonian onomastic province:

Arbo
Arsa (possibly Thracian)
Callo
Daetor
Iauletis (genitive)
Pirusta
Proradus
Scirto
Vietis (genitive)

Northern Pannoni:

Bato
Breucus
Dases
Dasmenus
Licco
Liccaius

Names attested among the Colapiani, an Illyric tribe of Pannonia:

Bato
Cralus
Liccaius
Lirus
Plassarus

Among the Jasi: Scenus. The Breuci: Scilus Bato (first and last name), Blaedarus, Dasmenus, Dasius, Surco, Sassaius, Liccaius, Lensus. The Amantini, the Scordisci: Terco, Precio, Dases, Dasmenus.

Messapic
Dasius, Latin form of a Messapic name from southern Italy.

Illyrian theonyms

The following names of gods (theonyms) derive from possibly several languages (Liburnian, Illyrian, etc.) and are names of gods worshipped by the Illyrians. However, they are known through Interpretatio romana and their names may have been corrupted.

Anzotica
Armatus
Bindus
Boria
Eia
Ica
Iria
Latra
Malesocus
Medaurus
Sentona
Thana
Vidasus

External influences

The Ancient Greek language would have become an important external influence on Illyrian-speakers who occupied lands adjacent to ancient Greek colonies, mainly on the Adriatic coast. The Taulantii and the Bylliones had, according to Strabo, become bilingual. Invading Celts who settled on lands occupied by Illyrians brought the Illyrians into contact with the Celtic languages and some tribes were Celticized especially those in Dalmatia and the Pannoni. Intensive contact may have happened in what is now Bosnia, Croatia, and Serbia. Due to this intensive contact, and because of conflicting classical sources, it is unclear whether some ancient tribes were Illyrian or Celtic (ex: Scordisci) or mixed in varying degree. Thracians and Paeonians also occupied lands populated by Illyrians, bringing Illyrians into contact with the Thracian language and Paeonian language. Certainly, no serious linguistic study of Illyrian language could be made without the inclusion of Latin, in addition to ancient Greek, Thracian and Celtic languages, as the peoples that spoke those languages were recorded by both ancient and modern historians to have lived in lands inhabited by Illyrians at one period of time in history or another. Last, but certainly not least, any comprehensive study of Illyrian language must take into account the Indo-European glossary.

Celtic
The following Illyrian names derive from Celtic:

Aioia
Ammida (questionable)
Andetia
Argurianus (Thracian or Celtic)
Arvus
Baeta
Belzeius
Bidna
Boio
Bricussa
Cambrius
Catta
Dussona
Enena
Iaca
Iacus
Iaritus
Kabaletus
Lautus
Litus
Madusa
Madussa
Mallaius
Mascelio
Matera (questionable)
Matisa
Mellito (Greek and Celtic)
Nantanius
Nantia
Nindia
Nonntio
Pinenta (possible)
Poia
Sarnus
Seius
Seneca (questionable)
Sicu
Sinus
Sisimbrius
Totia
Vepus

Thracian
The following names derive from Thracian:

Argurianus (Thracian or Celtic)
Auluporis
Auluzon
Bessus
Bithus
Celsinus
Celsus
Cocaius
Daizo
Delus
Dida
Dinentilla
Dizas
Dizo
Dolens
Eptaikenthos
Ettela
Mania
Moca
Murco
Mucatralis
Mucatus
Teres
Torcula
Tzitzis

Greek
The following names may derive from Greek:
Ardiaioi, the ancient Greek name for Ardiaei (ardis, 'head of the arrow, sting').  One challenge to this theory is that the suggested root-word ardis does not necessarily form  'Ardiaioi', by the rules of Greek language
Ceraunii, tribal exonym, ("Κεραύνιοι, "Thunderbolt-men)"
Cleitus, ("κλειτός", "renowned man")
Glaukias, ("γλαυκός", "gleaming man")
Illyrians, gr. , tribal exonym
Mellito, Greek and Celtic element, gr. , "like honey"
Plator, gr. , "wide man"
Pleuratus, gr. , "side'"

Latin
The following names may derive from Latin:
Ardiaei, (ardea, 'heron'). However, the problem with the theory supporting the Latin etymology for the Ardiaei is that Ardiaioi, a Greek form of Ardiaei is found in several pre-Roman sources, and it turns that it precedes the Roman/Latin Influence, as it precedes the Vardaei, another form of this name. Greek historian Strabo says in paragraph 6 (Book 7, chapter 5) of his Geographica: “The Ardiaei were called by the men of later times "Vardiaei".

References

Bibliography

Further reading
 Mayer, Anton. “Der Satem-Charakter Des Illyrischen.” Glotta 24, no. 3/4 (1936): 161–203. http://www.jstor.org/stable/40265417.

Illyrian languages